Live at Ronnie Scott's may refer to:

 Live at Ronnie Scott's (Nina Simone album), 1984
 Live at Ronnie Scott's (Jamie Cullum album), 2006
 Live at Ronnie Scott's (Fourth World album), 1992
 Live at Ronnie Scott's (Curtis Mayfield album), 1988
 Live at Ronnie Scott's (Taj Mahal album), recorded in 1988 and released in 1990
 Live at Ronnie Scott's (Wes Montgomery album), 1965
 Live at Ronnie Scott's (Buddy Rich album), 1980
 Live at Ronnie Scott's (Jeff Beck album), 2008
 Live at Ronnie Scott's (video), a DVD by Lisa Stansfield

See also
 Ronnie Scott's Jazz Club, a jazz club which has operated in London since 1959
 Very Alive at Ronnie Scotts, an alternative title for the Buddy Rich big band album Rich in London (1971)